Robert Brennan may refer to:

 Bobby Brennan (1925–2002), English professional footballer
 Bobby Brennan (soccer) (born 1979), American soccer defender
 Robbie Brennan (1947–2016), Irish drummer and a former member of the band Grand Slam
 Robert E. Brennan (born 1944), American businessman
 Robert Brennan (priest) (born 1941), priest and social activist
 Robert Brennan (journalist) (1881–1964), Irish writer, diplomat and a founder of The Irish Press newspaper
 Robert J. Brennan (born 1962), American prelate of the Roman Catholic Church